WWF European Rampage Tour is a game based on the World Wrestling Federation (WWF), created by Arc Developments in 1992 for the Amiga, Atari ST, Commodore 64 and DOS. It capitalizes on the success of the previous WWF game for home computers, WWF WrestleMania, and was aimed predominantly at the European markets. It was the last WWF game released strictly for home computers until the release of WWF With Authority! in 2001.

Gameplay

One or two players form a tag team choosing from Hulk Hogan, "Macho Man" Randy Savage, The Ultimate Warrior, and Bret Hart and then must first defeat the tag teams of The Nasty Boys, The Natural Disasters and Money Inc. three times each (first in The Britannic Arena in London, England, followed by The Deutsche Nationale Arena in Munich, Germany, and finally the Palais Omnisports de Paris-Bercy, France). The final match is a championship bout (which is thus the only one that can't be won via a countout) with The Legion of Doom in New York City's Madison Square Garden.

The game was praised for its presentation, with the Amiga version featuring sampled entrance themes and speech. Unfortunately, the in-game graphics and gameplay were limited. Each wrestler possesses the same basic wrestling attacks including punches, kicks, dropkicks, backbreakers and powerslams (regular ones, which are very hard to perform, or Gorilla press ones, which are easy to perform but fail to lift The Natural Disasters except by The Ultimate Warrior). Unlike its predecessor WWF Wrestlemania, there is no time limit for the matches.

The game also features a two-player practice mode, however, player 2 is automatically assigned the Nasty Boys team (whose names are wrongly switched in this game).

Commodore 64 version
The Commodore 64 version plays much like its counterparts, except it features only singles matches. The four selectable wrestlers from the other versions are also present in this version. The player must defeat Typhoon from The Natural Disasters, Irwin R. Schyster from Money Inc. and Jerry Sags from The Nasty Boys in various venues before challenging Animal from The Legion of Doom for the championship. A two-player practice mode is also included.

See also
List of licensed professional wrestling video games
List of fighting games

References

External links

1992 video games
Amiga games
Atari ST games
Commodore 64 games
DOS games
Ocean Software games
Europe-exclusive video games
WWE video games
Video games scored by Mark Cooksey
Video games set in Europe
Video games set in New York City
Multiplayer and single-player video games
Professional wrestling games
Video games developed in the United Kingdom
Arc Developments games